Sant Llorenç de Balàfia is a small village in the north central area of the Spanish island of Ibiza. The village is in the municipality of Sant Joan de Labritja. The village lies to the west the designated road PM-733 which connects Ibiza town with the village of Sant Joan de Labritja.

Description
The ancient village of Sant Llorenç de Balàfia, is often just known by the name Balàfia. This name derives from a time past when this was a Moorish village. The oldest part of the village consists of a grouping of seven houses which includes two refuge towers and two trulls (Olive Oil Press). From the main road (C733) a narrow lane branches away and passes close to an old well before winding its way through the aforementioned group of houses. The original builders believed in strength through numbers as shown by the way this settlement was built, with the dwellings in close proximity to each other. The seven house are strung out along a gently sloping ridge running north to south.

References

Populated places in Ibiza